The Marriage Equality Act is a 2011 landmark New York State law that made same-sex marriage legal. The bill was introduced in the New York State Assembly by Assemblyman Daniel O'Donnell and in the New York State Senate by Senator Thomas Duane. It was signed into law by Gov. Andrew Cuomo on June 24, 2011 and took effect on July 24, 2011.

Background

Before July 24, 2011, New York only allowed for recognition of same-sex marriages legally performed in other states of the union and in countries where same-sex marriage is legal, such as Canada and Spain; the state also limited legal recognition of in-state same-sex relationships to the rights of unregistered cohabitation, and numerous municipalities afforded domestic partnership registries to residents engaged in same-sex relationships.

The bill made New York the sixth state in the United States to legalize and retain the in-state certification and legalization of same-sex marriage (excluding California, which legalized and performed some 18,000 same-sex marriages before a ban on further marriages was promulgated through referendum), and also made the state the most populous in the union to do so.

Prior legislative history
Same-sex marriage legislation passed the New York State Assembly for the first time on June 19, 2007 by a vote of 85-61. The bill languished in the Republican-controlled Senate before dying and being returned to the Assembly. Then-governor Eliot Spitzer promoted the bill among lawmakers in Albany.

Governor David Paterson introduced same-sex marriage legislation on April 16, 2009. The Assembly passed a same-sex marriage bill on May 12, 2009 with a majority of 89-52, but the bill languished in the Senate during the November 10 special session. It was re-passed by the Assembly on December 2, but the Senate defeated it on the same day by a vote of 38-24. All Senate Republicans voted against the bill, and eight Democratic senators joined them.

In 2010, several senators who had voted against same-sex marriage in 2009 were defeated. They were: Democrat Darrel Aubertine (defeated by a Republican), Democrats Hiram Monserrate and Bill Stachowski (both of whom were defeated in Democratic primaries by opponents who supported same-sex marriage) and Republican Frank Padavan. Also in 2010, three senators who had voted in favor of same-sex marriage in 2009 were defeated (although the marriage issue was not a prominent one in their 2010 re-election campaigns). They were Democrats Brian Foley, Craig M. Johnson, and Antoine Thompson.

Activism and civil disobedience campaign
After the effort to pass marriage equality legislation failed in New York in 2009, LGBTQ activists escalated the fight for same-sex marriage almost immediately in 2010. Activists formed a direct action group named Queer Rising and staged a protest outside the New York City marriage bureau. Those activists then increased the number of direct action protests and succeeded in putting the issue of marriage equality on the social and legislative agenda for over a year. Queer Rising inspired the creation or actions of other LGBTQ or civil rights groups that, likewise, put pressure on the Government to enact marriage equality. When it was revealed that the Catholic Church was lobbying against passage of marriage equality, activists protested outside St. Patrick's Cathedral in Manhattan to demand marriage equality. Some of the activists who led or participated in the direct action that was key to the movement for marriage equality, included Alan Bonville, Iana Di Bona, Bob the Drag Queen, Honey La Bronx, Jake Goodman, Rich Murray, Natasha Dillon, and many others. Activists created an environment of urgency for the Government to act.

Against this backdrop, activists began to exert pressure on government officials to pass marriage equality legislation in New York. Sen. Shirley Huntley (D-Queens), who had voted against same-sex marriage legislation in 2009, was targeted for a direct action protest by the group Connecting Rainbows in April 2011.

Passage

Governor Andrew Cuomo, like his predecessor Paterson, promoted the bill and the general movement for legalization of same-sex marriage in the state. The majority of the Democratic senatorial caucus—which constituted the minority in the Senate in June 2011—also supported legalization of same-sex marriage. However, in May 2011, the Conservative Party of New York State stated that it would withdraw support for any candidate who supported same-sex marriage.

On June 13, 2011, three Democratic senators who voted against the December 2009 same-sex marriage bill (Shirley Huntley, Carl Kruger and Joseph Addabbo Jr.) announced their support for the Marriage Equality Act. James Alesi became the first Republican senator to announce his support for the bill, and Roy McDonald became the second on June 14, narrowing the requirement for passage to just one. Democratic senator Rubén Díaz, Sr. was a vocal opponent of the legalization and resigned from the bicameral Black, Puerto Rican, Hispanic, and Asian Legislative Caucus to demonstrate his opposition to its position on the legislation.

On June 15, 2011, the New York State Assembly passed the Marriage Equality Act by a margin of 80 to 63; this was a smaller margin of victory than three same-sex marriage bills had attained in the Assembly in prior years. On the same day, Governor Cuomo issued a message of necessity to the Senate, allowing the bill to bypass the normal three-day aging process.

A Senate vote was delayed while closed-door negotiations took place between the Governor and the Senate's Republican leadership. The bill was made part of the "controversial calendar" which was eventually moved to the Friday following the intended end of the legislative session on June 20. From June 15 to June 24, protests both for and against the vote took place inside and around the capital complex, and organizations such as the Empire State Pride Agenda, the Human Rights Campaign, New Yorkers for Marriage Equality, New Yorkers for Constitutional Freedoms, and the National Organization for Marriage took part in the rallies. As thousands of New York residents lobbied the Senators on both sides of the issue, Senator Greg Ball invited the public to participate in an online poll on Twitter and Facebook. Ball eventually decided to vote against the bill.

On June 24, Senate Majority Leader Dean Skelos announced that the Senate would consider the legislation as the final bill of the legislative session. Skelos had previously stated that Republican senators would be free to vote their consciences on the bill if it came to the floor.

The bill was considered on the Senate floor on June 24. While the Senate met, the Assembly voted on a set of amendments developed to win the support of Senators concerned about the Act's impact on religion-based opposition to same-sex marriage, which detailed exemptions for religious and benevolent organizations. The exemptions are tied to a severability clause, ensuring that if the religious exemptions were successfully challenged in court, the entire legislation would not be ruled invalid. The proposed amendments passed with little debate by a vote of 36-26. The same-sex marriage bill passed later that evening by a vote of 33-29. Governor Andrew Cuomo signed the act into law at 11:55 P.M. Republican senators Mark Grisanti and Stephen Saland joined Sens. Alesi and McDonald as the only Republicans supporting the legislation, while Sen. Ruben Diaz cast the only Democratic vote against the bill.

On June 25, the Gotham Gazette reported that Senate rules had been changed the previous day  "in a backroom agreement before session started and then changed again during the vote to make sure it would be concluded to make the 11 p.m. newscasts." The Gazette also reported that Sen. Ruben Diaz, Sr., an opponent of same-sex marriage, was ignored when he requested that the bill be laid aside for debate. According to Sen. Kevin Parker, Senate Democrats were informed prior to the vote that each Senator would have two minutes to explain his or her vote; however, legislators were not allowed to speak on the bill. The Gazette further reported that the vote was expedited because of Gov. Cuomo's desire to have the bill's passage covered on that evening's news. Sen. Parker added that the doors to the Senate chamber were locked on the evening of June 24 to prevent senators from leaving the chamber when the bill was voted upon.

The Act took effect on July 24, 2011.

In addition to legalizing same-sex marriage, the Marriage Equality Act also prohibited state and local courts and governments from penalizing religious and religious-supervised institutions, their employees, and their clergy for refusing to sanctify or recognize marriages that contradict their religious doctrines or for declining to provide services and accommodations in connection with such marriages.

Final Senate roll call

Response

Organizations

 Freedom to Marry's Evan Wolfson said, "With the freedom to marry in New York, the nationwide majority for marriage will swell, as even more people get to see why marriage matters to same-sex couples, that gay couples, like non-gay, treasure the chance to affirm and strengthen their commitment, and that ending marriage discrimination helps families and hurts no one"
 National Organization for Marriage tweeted, "Marriage loses 33-29 in New York. Sad day for the state and the country. But the fight has just begun." 
The Conservative Party of New York said it would withdraw support for any candidate who voted for the Marriage Equality Act.
 The New York State Catholic Conference, led by Archbishop Timothy Dolan, stated to NBC News that it was "deeply disappointed and troubled" by the bill's passage and added that the Marriage Equality Act would "alter radically and forever humanity's historic understanding of marriage."

Politicians
 Governor Andrew Cuomo, who signed the bill into law, said that "New York has finally torn down the barrier that has prevented same-sex couples from exercising the freedom to marry and from receiving the fundamental protections that so many couples and families take for granted." He also said that "With the world watching, the Legislature, by a bipartisan vote, has said that all New Yorkers are equal under the law."  Governor Cuomo made a speech calling for all states to legalize same-sex marriage; Cuomo stated that "We need marriage equality in every state in this nation…  Otherwise, no state really has marriage equality, and we will not rest until it is a reality."  Following the passage of the Marriage Equality Act, Governor Cuomo was criticized for describing the viewpoints of same-sex marriage opponents as being "anti-American."
 Mayor of New York City Michael Bloomberg, whose in-progress news conference was interrupted by City Council Speaker Christine Quinn who announced the passage of the bill, called the passage "a historic triumph for equality and freedom." He also said that he would support the Republicans who voted in favor of the bill in the next legislative election.
 White House spokesperson Shin Inouye told the Washington Blade by e-mail that "The president has long believed that gay and lesbian couples deserve the same rights and legal protections as straight couples." He further stated "That's why he has called for repeal of the so-called 'Defense of Marriage Act' and determined that his administration would no longer defend the constitutionality of DOMA in the courts. The states should determine for themselves how best to uphold the rights of their own citizens. The process in New York worked just as it should." On June 23, incumbent President Barack Obama delivered a speech at the Human Rights Campaign's annual gala in which he did not take an explicit position on marriage equality, but instead iterated that New York was "doing exactly what democracies are supposed to do," insisting that the decision should be left to state governments.
 U.S. junior Senator for New York Kirsten Gillibrand stated that "New York has always led the way for equal rights – from leading the suffrage movement, to Abraham Lincoln's remarkable speech opposing slavery at Cooper Union, and we have done it again."
 Congressmember Jerrold Nadler stated that "Now more than ever, we must pass the Respect for Marriage Act, my legislation to repeal the discriminatory DOMA, and allow New Yorkers and others who are - or will be - legally married to take part in the full measure of protections and obligations of federal law. Just last night in New York City, President Obama reiterated his belief that DOMA violates our Constitution and must be repealed."
 Former New York governor and state senator David Paterson praised the vote, saying "Tonight, I am ecstatic, I am elated, and I am proud to be a New Yorker." He also reciprocated accolades offered to him by Cuomo and referred to his own 2008 directive to recognize out-of-state marriages.

Town clerks
Two town clerks, one in Barker and another in Granby, resigned their positions due to moral and religious objections to signing marriage certificates for same-sex couples. For the same reason, a clerk in Guilderland announced she would continue in her position but would no longer officiate at any weddings, allowing another official to do so in her stead. The town clerk of Volney said she will not sign marriage certificates for same-sex couples unless forced to do so. Kathleen Rice, the district attorney for Nassau County, warned all town clerks within her jurisdiction they could face criminal charges if any refused to perform their duties with respect to same-sex marriages.  Ledyard Town Clerk Rose Marie Belforti made state and national headlines when she notified the Town of Ledyard that she would not sign gay marriage certificates due to her religious beliefs.  Belforti later delegated marriage applications to a deputy.  Same-sex marriage advocates and some town residents criticized Belforti for taking this action, and resident Ed Easter attempted to unseat her in the fall of 2011.  Belforti was re-elected by a substantial margin.  Governor Cuomo took the position that municipal employees responsible for solemnizing or licensing marriages were obliged to solemnize and/or license same-sex marriage licenses as well.  "If you can't enforce the law, then you shouldn't be in that position," Cuomo said.

Media personalities
 Musician and New York native Lady Gaga, who had personally lobbied senators and had urged fans of her music to call or write their senators, stated on Twitter that "The revolution is ours to fight for love, justice, and equality."
 Wendy Williams posted to Twitter "Yay for Gay Marriage! NY, it's about time... jersey we're next! How you doin?"
 Cyndi Lauper stated that "I have never be[sic] prouder to be a lifelong New Yorker than I am today with the passage of marriage equality. "
 Star Trek actor and California resident George Takei, who, with his husband Brad Altman, owns an apartment in New York City, said that "good waves coming from New York is going to make a profound influence on our situation here." Takei and Altman are among 18,000 same-sex couples who were married in California during the 2008 window period prior to the passage of Proposition 8 by referendum.
 At the 2011 BET Awards, Kerry Washington compared the situation to earlier prohibitions on interracial marriage, saying "we have to be very careful about legislating love in this country. If we say that people of a certain sexual orientation can't be married, we might go back to saying that people of different races can't be married. And we can't afford to do that."

Ensuing elections and appointments
Four Republican state senators−Sens. James Alesi, Mark Grisanti, Roy McDonald, and Stephen Saland−voted in favor of same-sex marriage in 2011. Following their votes, the four senators received public support from New York City Mayor Michael Bloomberg, who scheduled a fundraiser for the four senators that was expected to raise $1.25 million. Mayor Bloomberg also made maximum contributions to each of their re-election campaigns.

On May 9, 2012, Alesi announced that he would not run for re-election. He stated that many factors, including the welfare of the Republican Party, led to his decision. Prior to Alesi's announcement, Assemblyman Sean Hanna had expressed interest in challenging Alesi in the Republican primary. Alesi indicated that his same-sex marriage vote would have "severely hampered" his chances in a Republican primary.

Grisanti, McDonald, and Saland each faced primary challenges in 2012. Grisanti defeated attorney Kevin Stocker, 59% to 40%, after a campaign in which "much of the bitterest politicking had revolved around Grisanti's controversial 2011 vote to support legalizing same-sex marriage in the state." In the general election, Grisanti defeated three other candidates, including a Conservative Party challenger who opposed same-sex marriage.

In the District 43 Republican primary, McDonald faced Saratoga County Clerk Kathleen Marchione, who criticized McDonald's vote for same-sex marriage. After a primary contest that was described as "divisive", "bitter," and "nasty," Marchione declared victory by a narrow margin on September 25, 2012. McDonald later opted to cease his campaign and support Marchione. Marchione won the general election on November 6, 2012. Following McDonald's loss, a Newsday headline described the senator as "a political casualty of same-sex marriage."

In District 41, Saland received a Republican primary challenge from Neil Di Carlo. Saland won by a margin of 107 votes. Di Carlo continued his campaign as the candidate of the Conservative Party, and Saland lost the general election to Democrat Terry Gipson by a margin of 2,096 votes. Di Carlo acted as a spoiler, receiving 17,300 votes on the Conservative line.

Of the four Republican state senators who voted in favor of the Marriage Equality Act, only one—Mark Grisanti—was re-elected to the State Senate in 2012. Grisanti was defeated in the 2014 elections.

In 2013, Gov. Andrew Cuomo appointed Alesi to a $90,000-per-year post on the Unemployment Insurance Appeal Board.

In 2015, Gov. Cuomo appointed Grisanti to the New York State Court of Claims. Grisanti's appointment was confirmed by the New York State Senate in May 2015. The reported salary for the judgeship was $174,000.

In 2016, Gov. Cuomo appointed Saland to the board of the state Thruway Authority.

In June 2017, Gov. Cuomo nominated Alesi to a $109,800-per-year position on the state's Public Service Commission; the Senate confirmed his appointment.

Lawsuits
Sen. Ruben Diaz, Sr., a Democrat and the most prominent opponent of the Act, announced at a rally on July 24, 2011, that he would file a lawsuit alleging that the same-sex marriages performed on that day were illegal. Diaz said the lawsuit would challenge judicial waivers that allowed a same-sex couple to marry on the same day they applied for a marriage license.

On July 25, 2011, New Yorkers for Constitutional Freedoms, along with Liberty Counsel, filed a lawsuit in the New York Supreme Court for Livingston County against the New York Senate and other state offices seeking an injunction against the Act. On November 18, 2011, Acting Supreme Court Justice Robert B. Wiggins allowed the plaintiffs' claims under the Open Meetings Law, but dismissed other portions of the case. He noted: "It is ironic that much of the state's brief passionately spews sanctimonious verbiage on the separation of powers in the governmental branches, and clear arm-twisting by the Executive on the Legislative permeates this entire process." On July 6, 2012, a five-judge panel of the Appellate Division ruled unanimously that no violation of the Open Meetings Law had occurred and dismissed the suit. On August 6, 2012, Liberty Counsel appealed to the New York Court of Appeals, which declined to hear the appeal on October 23.

References

External links
 Text of the bill 

LGBT rights in New York (state)
2011 in American law
2011 in LGBT history
2011 politics in New York (state)
Same-sex marriage legislation in the United States
Articles containing video clips